Virginia's 8th Senate district is one of 40 districts in the Senate of Virginia. It has been represented by Republican Bill DeSteph since 2016, succeeding fellow Republican Jeff McWaters.

Geography
District 8 is located in the City of Virginia Beach, encompassing all of the city's coastline along the Atlantic Ocean.

The district is contained entirely within Virginia's 2nd congressional district, and overlaps with the 21st, 81st, 82nd, and 84th districts of the Virginia House of Delegates. Its far southern tip borders the state of North Carolina.

Recent election results

2019

2015

2011

Federal and statewide results in District 8

Historical results
All election results below took place prior to 2011 redistricting, and thus were under different district lines.

2010 special

2007

2003

1999

1995

References

Virginia Senate districts
Virginia Beach, Virginia